Jorge García (born 2 May 1961) is a Spanish long-distance runner. He competed in the men's 5000 metres at the 1984 Summer Olympics.

References

1961 births
Living people
Athletes (track and field) at the 1984 Summer Olympics
Spanish male long-distance runners
Olympic athletes of Spain
Place of birth missing (living people)